These are the results of the men's singles competition in badminton at the 2004 Summer Olympics in Athens.

The tournament consisted of a single-elimination tournament. Matches were played using a best-of-three games format. Games were played to 15 points, using the old scoring system. Each game had to be won by a margin of two points.

The top eight seeds in the tournament were placed in the bracket so as not to face each other until the quarterfinals. All other competitors were placed by draw.

Seeds

   (round of 32)
   (quarter-finals)
   (round of 16)
   (round of 16)
  (round of 16)
  (quarter-finals)
  (silver medallist)
  (bronze medallist)

Draw

Bronze-medal match
 
(15-11,17-16)

Sources
Men's singles draws and results - InternationalBadminton.org

Badminton at the 2004 Summer Olympics
Men's events at the 2004 Summer Olympics